The white-naped seedeater (Sporophila fringilloides) is a species of bird in the family Thraupidae. Sometimes classified in the bunting and American sparrow family Emberizidae, more recent studies have shown it to belong in the Thraupidae. 

It is found in Brazil, Colombia, and Venezuela.
Its natural habitat is subtropical or tropical dry shrubland.

References

white-naped seedeater
Birds of the Amazon Basin
Birds of the Colombian Amazon
Birds of the Venezuelan Amazon
white-naped seedeater
white-naped seedeater
Taxonomy articles created by Polbot
Tanagers